Albin Karl-Axel Magnusson Skoglund (born 1 February 1997) is a Swedish footballer who plays for Utsikten.

Club career
On 21 December 2020, Skoglund agreed to return to Utsikten on a two-year contract.

Personal life
He is the grandson and grand-nephew of former professional footballers Karl-Evert "Ya" Skoglund and Lennart "Nacka" Skoglund respectively.

References

External links 
 

Swedish footballers
Allsvenskan players
Superettan players
Ettan Fotboll players
1997 births
Living people
BK Häcken players
Örgryte IS players
Varbergs BoIS players
IK Oddevold players
Utsiktens BK players
Ljungskile SK players
Association football midfielders